Resurrection Through Carnage is the debut studio album from Swedish death metal group Bloodbath. It was released on November 12, 2002, on Century Media Records. It is the only album to feature Dan Swanö on drums, as he later switched to playing guitar and the last with Mikael Åkerfeldt until his return on The Fathomless Mastery.

Track listing

Personnel
Mikael Åkerfeldt – vocals
Anders Nyström – guitar, backing vocals
Jonas Renkse – bass, backing vocals
Dan Swanö – drums, backing vocals

References

2002 debut albums
Bloodbath albums
Century Media Records albums
Albums produced by Dan Swanö
Albums with cover art by Travis Smith (artist)